The McLaren GT is a sports car designed and manufactured by British automobile manufacturer McLaren Automotive. It is the company's first dedicated grand tourer and is based on the same platform underpinning the 720S with the addition of a carbon fibre rear deck to house a glazed tailgate creating significantly greater storage capacity.

The GT was first announced at the 2019 Geneva Motor Show, but full details of the car were not released until May 15 of the same year.

Specifications

Engine 
The GT features a new variation of the  twin-turbocharged M840T V8 engine found in the 720S. Having a new dedicated codename of M840TE, the new engine has smaller turbochargers that deliver lower peak performance than its Super Series variant but greater low RPM-performance and responsiveness.

Suspension 
The suspension system in the GT is also derived from the system in the 720S. The car utilises double wishbones at the front and rear axles, and a modified version of the ProActive Chassis Control II active damping system called Proactive Damping Control.

Performance 

Interior 
The McLaren GT features 150 litres of storage space at the front and 420 litres in the rear, accommodating a full-sized set of golf clubs.

Nappa leather is standard upholstery, but drivers can also choose from a softer hide made by Bridge of Weir Leather in Scotland or in the future, cashmere. The new comfort seats have increased shoulder padding and back support, with electrical adjustment and heating as standard on Pioneer and Luxe models. A 7 inch touchscreen mounted in the centre controls a revamped infotainment system and is supplemented by a 12.3 inch driver information display which changes in layout depending on whether Comfort, Sport or Track mode is selected.

Gallery

References

External links 

 Official product page

GT
Cars introduced in 2019
Rear mid-engine, rear-wheel-drive vehicles
2020s cars
Grand tourers